Francisco Gali (1539 in Seville – 1586 in Manila) was a Spanish sailor and cartographer, active in the second half of the 16th century across the Pacific Ocean and in New Spain and Spanish East Indies, particularly Philippines. He is best known for his three trans-Pacific crossings: Acapulco to Manila in 1583, Macau to Acapulco in 1584 and in 1585 again Acapulco to Manila, where he died. At least the last trip was by order of the Spanish viceroy of New Spain, Pedro Moya de Contreras. His journeys were on the Manila galleons which had started the route in 1565.

For reasons unknown, Gali's report on the Macau-Acapulco journey fell into the hands of Jan Huygen van Linschoten who included that information in his Itinerario (1596).

See also
 Pedro de Unamuno
 João da Gama

Sources
 Inglis, Robin (2008).  Historical Dictionary of the Discovery and Exploration of the Northwest Coast of America 
 .
 Morato-Moreno, Manuel (2017). The Map of Tlacotalpa by Francisco Gali, 1580: An Early Example of a Local Coastal Chart in Spanish America

External links
 Itinerario, voyage ofte schipvaert, naer Oost ofte Portugaels Indien inhoudende een corte beschryvin

References

1539 births
1586 deaths
Spanish explorers of the Pacific
People of Spanish colonial Philippines
People of New Spain
Colonial Mexico
16th-century Spanish people
16th century in the Spanish East Indies
Spanish East Indies
16th-century explorers